Cape Smith is a cape forming the north end of Smith Island in the South Shetland Islands, Antarctica.  The discovery of the South Shetland Islands was first reported in 1819 by Captain William Smith, for whom the cape is named.

Location

Maps
Chart of South Shetland including Coronation Island, &c. from the exploration of the sloop Dove in the years 1821 and 1822 by George Powell Commander of the same. Scale ca. 1:200000. London: Laurie, 1822.
  L.L. Ivanov. Antarctica: Livingston Island and Greenwich, Robert, Snow and Smith Islands. Scale 1:120000 topographic map. Troyan: Manfred Wörner Foundation, 2010.  (First edition 2009. )
 South Shetland Islands: Smith and Low Islands. Scale 1:150000 topographic map No. 13677. British Antarctic Survey, 2009.
 Antarctic Digital Database (ADD). Scale 1:250000 topographic map of Antarctica. Scientific Committee on Antarctic Research (SCAR). Since 1993, regularly upgraded and updated.
 L.L. Ivanov. Antarctica: Livingston Island and Smith Island. Scale 1:100000 topographic map. Manfred Wörner Foundation, 2017.

References 
 SCAR Composite Antarctic Gazetteer.

External links 
 Delyan Point. Adjusted Copernix satellite image

Headlands of Smith Island (South Shetland Islands)